Mariposa County High School is a public high school located in Mariposa, CA. The school is part of the Mariposa County Unified School District.

History 
Founded in 1914, Mariposa County High School was conceived after an election was held to figure out if the county should have a high school. The election was won with the majority of 666 beating those 608 votes against the school.

The school celebrated its 100th birthday in 2014.

Statistics

Demographics 
2016-17 510 students

Standardized Testing

Student Activities

Athletics 
The school is part of the CIF Sac-Joaquin Section in the Southern League along with seven other schools.
 Boys' Basketball
 Section Champions
 2015-16
 Girls' Basketball
 Section Champions
 1979-80
 Baseball
 Section Champions
 2007-08 
 2009-10 
 2011-12 
 2015-16 
 Softball
 Section Champions
 1978-79 
 1983-84 
 2011-12 
 2013-14
 2014-15 
 2015-16
 Football
 Section Champions
 1995-96
 2019-20
 Track
 Girls' Track
 Volleyball
 Section Champions
 1980-81 
 Boys' Soccer
 Section Champions
 2008-09 
 Girls' Soccer
 Golf
 Section Champions
 2015-16 
 Tennis
 Wrestling
 Section Champions
 2012-13 
 2015-16

Clubs 
 Art Club
 Dance Club
 Drama Club
 FFA
 French Club
 Frisbee Club
 Natural Helpers
 Poetry Club
 Rotary Interact Club
 Spanish Club
 Big Chad Esports Team

Notable alumni 
 George Radanovich, politician
 Russell Wong, actor
 Carolyn Yarnell, composer
 Logan Mankins, former NFL Offensive Lineman

References

External links 
 MCHS Band Website
 Grizzly Cinema
 MCHS Facebook Page

Mariposa County, California
Educational institutions established in 1914
Public high schools in California
1914 establishments in California